The Davis was a cyclecar manufactured in Detroit, Michigan, by the Davis Cyclecar Company in 1914.  The car used a two-cylinder Spacke air-cooled engine, and featured three-speed selective transmission and a double chain drive on a 93-inch wheelbase.  The Davis was similar to the French Bedelia (cyclecar) in that the driver sat in the rear seat. The tandem two-seater cost $425, but designer William Norris Davis was unable to secure the capital to undertake production. He moved to the West Coast and joined the Los Angeles Cyclecar Company.

References

Defunct motor vehicle manufacturers of the United States
Motor vehicle manufacturers based in Michigan
Cyclecars
Defunct manufacturing companies based in Michigan